David Hunter Miller (1875–1961) was a US lawyer and an expert on treaties who participated in the drafting of the covenant of the League of Nations.

He practiced law in New York City from 1911 to 1929; served on the Inquiry, a body of experts that collected data for the Paris Peace Conference (1917–1919); and was legal adviser to the American commission to the conference.

As an officer of the US Department of State (1929–1944), Miller headed the American delegation to the 1930 Hague Conference for the codification of international law. His published works include My Diary at the Conference of Paris, with Documents (21 vol., 1924–26) and Treaties and Other International Acts of the United States of America (8 vol., 1931–1948).

Partial bibliography

References

External links
 
 
David Hunter Miller papers. 1778-1941. 11.67 linear feet. At the University of Washington Libraries, Special Collections.

1875 births
1961 deaths
United States Department of State officials
American lawyers